Jake McGann (born 1990) is an English voice actor who has appeared in Doctor Who audio dramas.

Doctor Who
In 2007, he appeared in two Doctor Who audio dramas starring his father as the Doctor: Immortal Beloved and The Girl Who Never Was, before playing the title role in the 2009 audio, An Earthly Child, where he played the Doctor's great-grandson Alex Campbell. He reprised his role in the audio dramas Relative Dimensions and To the Death.

Family
He is the second and younger son of actor Paul McGann and Annie Milner. He has an elder brother, Joseph McGann, born in 1988. He is the nephew of actors Joe, Mark and Stephen McGann.

References

1990 births
21st-century English male actors
English male radio actors
English male child actors
Living people
Place of birth missing (living people)
Jake